The Brevard County Library System is a public library system in Brevard County, Florida that coordinates activities between its member public libraries, which collectively serve Brevard County. It is composed of 17 distinct branches stemming all the way from Mims to Micco, with the central administrative and largest of these libraries being the Catherine Schweinsberg Rood Central Library in Cocoa, Florida. It is governed by a board of trustees appointed and funded by the Brevard County Board of Commissioners. Its missions statement is "Brevard County Libraries enables people of all ages to improve their quality of life by providing information and enrichment through traditional resources and new technology." Its vision statement is "We will be recognized as a Library System that excels in providing efficient, modern, accessible and customer oriented services."

History 
The first library in Brevard County was founded in 1895 in Cocoa, FL. One room was rented for five dollars a month, and women in the community would take turns volunteering to run it. The books and supplies were donated by local citizens. By 1959, four other libraries were established in the county, and Florida Statute 150 gave funding to these libraries in agreement that they would serve all residents. The first five public libraries in the county were Cocoa, Cocoa Beach, Eau Gallie, Melbourne, and one servicing North Brevard in Titusville. With the Space Program boom in the 1960s, Brevard County's population grew, and the five libraries were expanded to nine. By November 1972, it was necessary for voters to approve a tax referendum that would establish a Library Tax District to fund the growing library system's budget. Currently, there are seventeen libraries within the Brevard County Library System.

In 1989, the Central Brevard Library moved to a building contributed by Florida Today. It was the first library in the county to discard the print card catalog and move to an electronic card catalog.

The first library in Merritt Island was housed in a trailer within a parking lot with books donated through a community book drive.

The F. T. DeGroodt Public Library was completed in June 1992 and is a 22,300 square foot facility which was built in the western area west of 1–95 in Palm Bay. The original Palm Bay Public Library was then renovated and remained open to serve the residents in the northeast area of Palm Bay. With the addition of this second library in Palm Bay the total number of libraries rose to fourteen (14) in the Brevard County Library System.

During a ceremony held on May 26, 2017, the Central Brevard Library, in Cocoa, FL, was officially renamed the Catherine Schweinsberg Rood Central Library, in honor of former Library Services Director Catherine Schweinsberg Rood. Rood worked in the country library system for 32 years, and spent 14 years serving as its director. She is noted for overseeing a number of impactful projects, including the implementation of the first online card catalog system in 1990, as well as the construction of four new libraries. She retired in 2012 and passed away from a battle with an undisclosed illness in 2016.

On December 1, 2022, the Brevard County Library System celebrated its 50th anniversary with a number of special activities and festivities held at the Catherine Schweinsberg Rood location, including "talks from former staff, presentations, historical photo displays, a video booth to record "what the library means to me" and more. Special 50th anniversary edition library cards, featuring a rocket blasting off into the sky, were also handed out to event participants for free.

Programs and services 
Each library has meeting rooms which are available for library programming, and community meetings. These rooms are vital to the community, as they offer space for free programs for all patrons.

Youth programs are an important part of each library and a variety of programs are offered, including summer reading programs, story hour programs, toddler times and bedtime story programs. Each library branch has a different set of programs for children ages infant to young adult. During the COVID-19 pandemic, youth services adapted their programs to better service patrons from home. Most library branches offered take home crafts that could be picked up curbside.

Adult programs are offered at every library as well, ranging in activities from painting classes, to book clubs, ukulele groups, quilting and yarn crafting groups, chess instructional groups, gardening and sustainable living classes, basic cooking lessons, gaming groups, movie nights, and yoga classes with new ideas forming new groups as the community needs or wants. 
Internet navigation assistance may also be provided upon request. This would be for those not well adjusted to largely technological functions necessary to achieve certain tasks such as printing, document scanning, or harmless information retrieval.

Talking Books/Homebound Services provides library materials to residents with visual and physical impairments and to those with limitations associated with age. A special collection of Talking Books is provided by the National Library for the Blind to serve the visually impaired and physically disabled population. The Talking Books service was originally established by an act of Congress in 1931.

Homebound patrons are served by a mail service which provides standard library materials to patrons through a mail order catalog. The Books by Mail program of the Brevard County Library System started in November 1983 and is still popular today, mailing over 5,000 books a month. This program is second in the State of Florida with only Orange County besting them.

DVDs and Blu-ray discs are also popular items available for loan.

Downloadable audio books and ebooks are available through Brevard County Libraries in a program called OverDrive with online instructions and selections for compatible audio and eBook devices. Books are now also offered in a MP3 format as well, compatible only on MP3 enabled devices.

In a more modern effort to reach patrons, some libraries in Brevard have created Instagram accounts, including the Eau Gallie Public Library, the Titusville Public Library, and the Satellite Beach Public Library. These social media accounts market library programs online, reaching younger patrons especially.

In addition, the official website for the county system includes an extensive array of free online resources for patron use. This includes access to investment research databases such as Morningstar, digital microfilms of the Florida Today newspaper, and access to the complete language learning software, Rosetta Stone.

Genealogy collections 
Three of the seventeen library branches within the Brevard County Public Library System have special genealogy collections available to the public for use within the library during regular hours. The Central Brevard Library in Cocoa, FL has the largest collection, staffed full-time and employing a certified genealogist. It began in 1989 and contains genealogical records, early Brevard County Courthouse records, and the entirety of a collection of documents originally held by Eastern Florida State College (formerly Brevard Community College). Items from the EFSC collection are available for Inter Library Loan within Brevard County. The Titusville Public Library and the Melbourne Public Library also have collections, and are staffed by volunteers.

Michael Boonstra, the youngest certified genealogist in Florida, is the head of the Catherine Schweinsberg Rood Central Library where the largest genealogy department for all of Brevard County is kept. He first became interested in history because of his grandparents: "I have been interested in history ever since I can remember. I attribute my interest to the influence of my maternal grandparents who loved history and lived in a home built in the 1790s that had been in the family for many generations in upstate New York. I spent most of my summers at their “farm,” learning and hearing about house and family history first hand."

Creative Lab 
Beginning in 2014, the Brevard Library Foundation, a non-profit dedicated to supporting the library system, began fundraising for a Creative Lab. The lab, which is in the Central Brevard Library in Cocoa, encourages STEM subject education by providing a space and the technology for creative engineering, electronics, music, video, and computer projects. A music recording studio, sound engineering station, and 3D printer is housed in the Creative Lab, and local experts teach classes for residents. Resources include two 3-D printers; Adobe Creative Cloud; maker kits that include littleBits electronic building blocks and Raspberry Pi boards, or small computers often used in do-it-yourself projects; a sewing machine; a workstation for grinding, engraving, sanding and polishing; and a podcasting station where you can “become a blogger, vlogger, or create your own podcast.”  The Creative Lab opened to the public in August 2016. Right now, there are two employees working in the Creative Lab. The lab has the same hours as the library and only slightly differs occasionally. Access to the Lab is free of charge, however, there is a charge for the materials used with the 3D printers. The Creative Lab also provides STEM crafts, with the option to take them home as COVID-19 continues. These crafts include light-up flowers and purses, poseable papercraft figures, robots, custom devices, science-based recipes and more. Former Creative Lab employee Ellery Cason says "They call makerspaces part of a movement for a very good reason,” Ms. Cason said. “This is the first makerspace in Brevard County, and it has opened the door for people not just to read about the amazing things they can do, but also to actually make them."

Library Con 
Library Con is an annual convention held jointly by the Brevard County Public Library system, Brevard County Parks and Recreation, and a local comics store called Famous Faces and Funnies. The first convention was held in 2018, and after a 2-year break due to the COVID-19 pandemic, resumed in 2022. Attendees of all ages are invited for an afternoon of comics, manga, STEM activities, cosplay, and more, with a variety of local food truck vendors providing an assortment of good eats and refreshments.

Branches 
Branches include:

 Canaveral Public Library
 Catherine Schweinsberg Rood Central Library
 Cocoa Beach Library
 Dr. Martin Luther King, Jr. Public Library
 Eau Gallie Public Library
 Franklin T. DeGroodt Memorial Library
 Melbourne Beach Public Library
 Melbourne Public Library
 Merritt Island Public Library
 Mims/Scottsmoor Public Library
 Palm Bay Public Library
 Port St. John Public Library
 Satellite Beach Public Library
 South Mainland/Micco Public Library
 Suntree/Viera Public Library
 Titusville Public Library
 West Melbourne Public Library

References

External links 
 Brevard County Public Libraries
 Eastern Florida State College
 Florida Institute of Technology

Education in Brevard County, Florida
County library systems in Florida
Public libraries in Florida